Joachim from the kindred Türje (also Ivachin or Iwachin) was a Hungarian nobleman and soldier in the first half of the 13th century. He served as the first known Count of Hermannstadt around 1210. Joachim was the forefather of the Szentgróti noble family.

Family
Joachim was born into the illustrious gens Türje, which originated from Zala County. His father Gecse I, was the first known member of the kindred. He had at least three siblings: Denis I, the father of the powerful baron Denis II, Gecse II, who served as ispán of Zala (1225) and Bars counties (1236–1240). An unidentified sister was also mentioned in 1254, when she was widow of a deceased male member of the gens Ákos. Joachim had two sons from his unidentified wife: Thomas participated in the Battle of Mohi, and later functioned as the ispán of Karakó ispánate. The Szentgróti family descended from him. Joachim's younger son was Philip, an influential prelate in the second half of the 13th century, who served as Bishop of Zagreb from 1247 or 1248 to 1262, and as Archbishop of Esztergom from 1262 until his death, and was a strong confidant of the Hungarian royal family.

Military career
Joachim was a faithful soldier of Andrew II of Hungary. Around 1210, he served as the first known Count of Hermannstadt (or Szeben), and in this capacity, he was the head of the Transylvanian Saxons living in the wider region of Hermannstadt (now Sibiu in Romania). When an uprising broke out in Vidin against Boril of Bulgaria in that year, the Bulgarian ruler was unable to suppress the rebellion without external assistance and turned to Andrew II, reminding him "their reliable friendship". In response, the Hungarian king sent Joachim to lead an army of Saxons, Vlachs, Székelys and Pechenegs across the Carpathian Mountains to fight for Boril of Bulgaria against three rebellious Cuman chieftains, according to a royal charter issued in 1250. The record suggests that the four ethnic groups were subjected to the Counts of Hermannstadt in the early 13th century. Joachim first routed the three Cuman chieftains who tried to halt his invasion, killing two of them in the battlefield, while the third one Karas was captured and sent to the Hungarian royal court as a prisoner. Following that Joachim's army marched along the Danube to Vidin, and besieged the castle. According to the 1250 charter, the Hungarian troops set fire to two gates of the fort and "fought valiantly". Joachim himself was gravely wounded in the skirmish, but Vidin was successfully captured and was given back to Boril, suppressing the rebellion against him.

For his military service and merits, Joachim was granted lands in Slanje (today in Croatia) and Varaždin County. Four decades later, Béla IV of Hungary issued a royal charter in Győr on 23 June 1250, which became the only source of information on Joachim's military campaign. In the document, the king confirmed Thomas and Philip, the sons of the late Joachim, in their inherited paternal land possessions, describing the merits of the three members of the Türje kindred. Joachim also participated in Andrew's military campaign against the Principality of Halych in 1211. He acted as a pristaldus (royal commissioner or "bailiff") in 1214, when comes Nicholas was inducted into the ownership of the land of Lendva (present-day Lendava, Slovenia).

References

Sources

 
 
 

12th-century Hungarian people
13th-century Hungarian people
Medieval Hungarian military leaders
Joachim